State Property is a rap group from Philadelphia, Pennsylvania, US, led by rapper Beanie Sigel with Philadelphia rappers Freeway, Peedi Crakk, Oschino Vasquez, and Omillio Sparks, and the duo Young Gunz (Young Chris and Neef Buck). State Property was signed to Jay-Z's Roc-A-Fella Records, but their future as a group is in dispute.

Background

The group's first release was the State Property soundtrack, which served as both the soundtrack to the 2002 film and the group's debut album.

After group head Beanie Sigel's incarceration in 2004, his relationship with the State Property camp or club went sour. Beanie complained that the rest of State Property was not showing him support while he was in jail, saying no one except Oschino from his group came to visit him. When the Roc-A-Fella split occurred, he also made the decision to move State Property to Dame's Dame Dash Music Group, but the rest of them opted to stay on Roc-A-Fella instead. Beanie Sigel's 2005 released album was The B. Coming.

Through Dame, Beanie declared State Property disbanded until further notice. In response, several members of the group began saying they never chose to be in the group and that they wouldn't have needed it to sell records. State Property eventually officially broke up, and a future group album is not planned.

However, recent mixtape tracks by members of State Property have featured other members of the group, suggesting that at least some of the members, or former members, including Sigel, are still on good terms.

Recently, the entire State Property were seen in New York together with the exception of Neef Buck, performing at a concert, saying "They're back like they never left".

"State Property" is also the name of a clothing line bearing their group insignia, run by Sigel as a subsidiary of Rocawear. Sigel starred in the 2002 independent film "State Property."

Discography

Studio albums

Singles

Mixtapes
 The Lost Files (2005)
 Gang's All Here (2006)
 Out on Bail (2007)
 The Return Of State Property (2011)
 The Chain Gang Vol.3 (2019)

Filmography
State Property (2002)
State Property 2 (2005)

References

External links 
Official MySpace

Hip hop collectives
Hip hop groups from Philadelphia
Roc-A-Fella Records artists
Gangsta rap groups